Bernard Malgrange (born 6 July 1928) is a French mathematician who works on differential equations and singularity theory. He proved the Ehrenpreis–Malgrange theorem and the Malgrange preparation theorem, essential for the classification theorem of the elementary catastrophes of René Thom. He received his Ph.D. from Université Henri Poincaré (Nancy 1) in 1955. His advisor was Laurent Schwartz. He was elected to the Académie des sciences in 1988. In 2012 he gave the Łojasiewicz Lecture (on "Differential algebraic groups") at the Jagiellonian University in Kraków.

Publications
Ideals of differentiable functions (Oxford University Press, 1966)
Équations différentielles à coefficients polynomiaux, Progress in Mathematics (Birkhäuser, 1991).

References

External links
 
 Académie des sciences page on Bernard Malgrange

See also
 Malgrange–Zerner theorem

1928 births
Living people
École Normale Supérieure alumni
20th-century French mathematicians
21st-century French mathematicians
Members of the French Academy of Sciences